The SEAT Tarraco is a mid-size crossover SUV manufactured by Spanish automaker SEAT. It is the flagship SUV of the Spanish car maker above the SEAT Arona and the SEAT Ateca, optionally available with seven seats. It is based on the Volkswagen Group's MQB-A2 platform, while closely related to the Volkswagen Tiguan Allspace and the Škoda Kodiaq.

It is named after the Mediterranean city of Tarragona, and it is manufactured in the Wolfsburg Volkswagen Plant in Germany. The production model was presented on 18 September 2018, and debuted at the 2018 Paris Motor Show in October 2018.

Name 
The name of the vehicle is intended to commemorate Tarraco, the former capital of the Roman province of Hispania Tarraconensis. This corresponds to the ancient name of the current city of Tarragona (Catalonia, Spain).

The name of the SUV was determined by a public vote and everyone was invited to suggest a name related to a Spanish geography with a maximum of three syllables. The initiative began in 2017, and in total, 10,130 suggestions from more than 130,000 people were received. After a preliminary examination based on linguistic and legal criteria, SEAT chose nine options, Abrera, Alborán, Arán, Aranda, Ávila, Donosti, Tarifa, Tarraco and Teide – among which Alborán, Aranda, Ávila and Tarraco were qualified for a final vote. With the Tarraco, SEAT for the first time in its history, let the name of one of its models be chosen among the people.

Originally, the name of the new SUV should have been announced in October 2017, however due to the independence referendum held in Catalonia at the time, SEAT finally announced the name on 19 February 2018. Of more than 150,000 participants, more than 35 percent voted in favour of Tarraco.

Overview 

The vehicle was launched in Tarragona, which is a town the car was named after. The Tarraco shares mechanical underpinnings with the Volkswagen Tiguan and Škoda Kodiaq, while its door panels are shared with the Volkswagen Tiguan Allspace. The car is built alongside the Tiguan at Volkswagen's factory in Wolfsburg, Germany. After the SEAT Alhambra MPV was discontinued, the Tarraco is the only SEAT model to offer a maximum of seven seats.

The Tarraco opens a new design language in SEAT, highlighting the front with a large front grille and new optics, and the return to an aesthetic bet already used by Giugiaro for SEAT at the beginning of the 90s; the unification of the rear lights telephone type, being influenced to the rest of the models of the brand from here on.

At launch, the SEAT Tarraco is available to order in four trim levels: SE, SE Technology, XCELLENCE and XCELLENCE LUX. All models come as standard with metallic paint, DAB radio, ‘Full Link’ (Android Auto and Apple CarPlay connectivity), 17-inch alloy wheels, an alarm and three-zone climate control.

Powertrain 
Two four-cylinder petrol engines are offered from launch: a  1.5-litre and a  2.0-litre. The former comes with a 6-speed manual transmission and front-wheel drive, while the latter gets a 7-speed dual-clutch automatic and four-wheel drive.

Safety

Latin NCAP
The German-made Tarraco in its most basic Latin American configuration with 7 airbags and ESC received 5 stars for adult occupants, 5 stars for toddlers, and Advanced Award from Latin NCAP in 2019.

Euro NCAP

Gallery

Sales and production figures

References

External links

 Official website

All-wheel-drive vehicles
Cars introduced in 2018
Crossover sport utility vehicles
Front-wheel-drive vehicles
Mid-size sport utility vehicles
Euro NCAP large off-road
Latin NCAP large off-road
Tarraco